John William Fozard,  (16 January 1928 – 17 July 1996) was a British aeronautical engineer who helped to design the Hawker Siddeley Harrier.

Early life
John Fozard was born on 16 January 1928 at 21 Home Street, Millbridge Liversege, (Heckmondwike, West Yorkshire) the son of John Fozard and Eleanor Paulkitt. He was brought up on the Firthcliffe estate at Liversedge, Kirklees, west of Heckmondwike. He grew up in austerity because his father was unemployed due to spinal injuries and only his maternal grandmother was in full-time employment.

He passed the selection for Heckmondwike Grammar School in the West Riding of Yorkshire, where he excelled academically. In 1942 (aged  14) he joined the Air Training Corps and with them visited RAF stations, where he flew in Lancaster and Halifax bombers.

Fozard's headmaster arranged for interviews with Avro in Yeadon and Blackburn Aircraft in Leeds. Blackburn offered him an apprenticeship that allowed him to study for an engineering degree. In June 1946 he was awarded a London University Intermediate degree. At this time Blackburn transferred Fozard to their Brough site, which allowed to continue his studies full-time at Hull municipal technical college, funded by a West Riding Council scholarship. In July 1948 he was awarded a B.Sc with first class honours in aeronautical engineering. An extension of his scholarship allowed  him to undertake two years postgraduate studies at College of Aeronautics, Cranfield under Prof Sir Robert Lickley where he gained a DCAe (Diploma in Aeronautics) in 1950.

Fozard would later tell American visitors at the Hawker plant on Lower Ham Road next to the River Thames at Kingston upon Thames that Yorkshire was the Texas of the UK.

Career
He worked for Hawker Siddeley from 1950, working under Sydney Camm. In the late 1950s he was working on the supersonic successor to the company's Hawker Hunter, the P.1121, and the twin-seat P.1129. Although advanced designs for their time, these projects were cancelled by the infamous 1957 Defence White Paper, and Hawker concentrated all work on the P.1127, which had been considered less important up to that point.

From October 1963 he was Chief Designer of the P.1154, which was cancelled in February 1965 (with the BAC TSR-2). He was Chief Designer of the Harrier from 1965 to 1978, taking over from Ralph Hooper. The Harrier entered service with the RAF (at RAF Wittering) in August 1969. The first Sea Harrier (XZ451 – FRS.1) was handed to the Royal Navy's Fleet Air Arm on 18 June 1979, at a ceremony at BAe Dunsfold (the site had been owned by Hawker Siddeley from 1950), later to be based at RNAS Yeovilton. This version of the Harrier had been given the definitive go-ahead (funding) on 15 May 1975 by Roy Mason, the Barnsley-born Defence Secretary, after being met with government indifference previously.

The Pegasus engine, which was integral to the aircraft design, was designed by Gordon Lewis and Sir Stanley Hooker.

From 1984–7 he was Divisional Director of Special Projects at the Military Aircraft Division of British Aerospace, Weybridge. In February 1989 he retired from BAe. He later became the Director of the National Air and Space Museum, and held the Charles A. Lindbergh Chair in Aerospace History, from 1988–9.

He was elected a Fellow of the Royal Aeronautical Society (FRAeS) in 1963. From 1986 to 1987, he was the President of the Royal Aeronautical Society. He was elected a Fellow of the Royal Society (FRS) in 1987.

Personal life
Fozard married Mary Ward in 1951, but they divorced in 1985. They had two sons. He later married Gloria Roberts in 1985, and they lived in Alexandria, Virginia.

He was awarded the OBE in 1981. He died from liver failure, aged 68.

Quotations

References

External links
 Telegraph obituary
 History of the Harrier
 Guardian obituary, 20 July 1996, page 32
 Times obituary, 24 July 1996, page 19

Alumni of Cranfield University
English aerospace engineers
Fellows of the Royal Aeronautical Society
Fellows of the Royal Academy of Engineering
Fellows of the Royal Society
Fellows of the American Institute of Aeronautics and Astronautics
Harrier Jump Jet
Hawker Siddeley
Officers of the Order of the British Empire
People from Heckmondwike
1928 births
1996 deaths
People educated at Heckmondwike Grammar School